Giuseppe Liberto (Chiusa Sclafani, 21 August 1943) is an Italian priest, choral director and composer. He was director of the Choir of the Sistine Chapel 1997–2010.

Life 
In 1997 Pope John Paul II called upon Liberto to serve as the Director of the Choir of the Sistine Chapel. He held this position until October 2021.

See also

References

1943 births
Living people